Manoleasa is a commune in Botoșani County, Western Moldavia, Romania. It is composed of eight villages: Flondora, Iorga, Liveni, Loturi, Manoleasa, Manoleasa-Prut, Sadoveni, Zahoreni.

Liveni is the commune's oldest attested village, being mentioned in a document of August 17, 1667.

References

Communes in Botoșani County
Localities in Western Moldavia
Populated places on the Prut